Æthelred (c. 762  – 18 April 796), was the king of Northumbria from 774 to 779 and again from 790 until he was murdered in 796. He was the son of Æthelwald Moll and Æthelthryth and possibly became king while still a child after Alhred was deposed.

Family and early life
The origin of Æthelred's family isn't recorded, but his father Æthelwald, who was also called Moll, seems to have come from a noble background. Æthelwald first appears in the historical records in a letter written by Pope Paul I to king Eadberht, ordering him to return lands taken from an Abbot Fothred, which were given to his brother Moll. After the abdication of king Eadberht in 758, his son Oswulf took his place but despite his father's long reign and his powerful uncle Ecgbert, he was murdered just a year later in 759 at Market Weighton by his own bodyguards. The murder was possibly ordered by Æthelwald as he became king soon after. In 761 Oswulf's brother Oswine met Æthelwald in battle but Oswine was killed in the fighting at Eildon Hill on 6 August.

After his victory, Æthelwald married Æthelthryth at Catterick on 1 November 762.  Æthelwald was deposed as king on 30 October 765, by a council of noblemen and prelates, and replaced by Alhred, the brother-in-law of Oswulf and Oswine.

First Term
After ruling for nearly ten years, the Northumbrians drove out King Alhred from York in 774.  They then chose Æthelred as their king and he was "crowned with such great honour".  In the year after his accession Æthelred, who may have been influenced by his father Æthelwald, ordered the killing of an Ealdorman, Eadwulf..

Æthelred was deposed as king and the throne passed on to Ælfwald, a grandson of Eadberht Eating.

Restoration

Æthelred lived in exile during the reign of Ælfwald and his successor Osred II. However, in 788 or 789, Osred was deposed, forcibly tonsured and exiled and Æthelred was restored to the throne.

In 790, during Æthelred's second reign, the ealdorman Eardwulf was ordered to be killed by Æthelred but survived and later became king. Ælfwald's sons Ælf and Ælfwine were killed, probably on Æthelred's orders, in 791. The next year Osred attempted to regain the throne, but was defeated, captured and killed on 14 September 792. A year later, Lindisfarne was sacked by the Vikings with Alcuin's letters to Æthelred blaming this event on the sins of Æthelred and his nobility.

On 29 September 792  Æthelred married Ælfflæd the daughter of Offa of Mercia at Catterick.

Death and succession

While Æthelred was in Corbridge a group of conspiring nobles murdered him on 18 April 796.  As a result, Osbald, an ealdorman and a friend of Alcuin, Æthelred's former adviser, became king, but within 27 days he abdicated.

References

Further reading
 Higham, N.J., The Kingdom of Northumbria AD 350-1100. Stroud: Sutton, 1993. 
 Kirby, D.P., The Earliest English Kings. London: Unwin, 1991. 
 Yorke, Barbara, Kings and Kingdoms of early Anglo-Saxon England. London: Seaby, 1990.

See also
List of monarchs of Northumbria

External links

760s births
796 deaths
Anglo-Saxon warriors
Northumbrian monarchs
8th-century English monarchs
8th-century murdered monarchs